Sultan Al-Shammeri (born 28 October 1991) is a Saudi football player. He currently plays for Al-Bukiryah as a winger.

Honours
Al-Fateh
Saudi Professional League: 2012–13
Saudi Super Cup: 2013

Al-Batin
MS League: 2019–20

References

1991 births
Living people
Saudi Arabian footballers
Al-Fateh SC players
Al-Tai FC players
Al Batin FC players
Al-Jabalain FC players
Arar FC players
Al-Bukayriyah FC players
Saudi Professional League players
Saudi First Division League players
Saudi Second Division players
Association football wingers